Tina Baker (born 4 May 1958 in Coalville, Leicestershire, England) is a broadcaster and journalist and a leading  British soap opera and TV critic. She has featured on many TV programmes such as Coronation Street Secrets, The Good Soap Guide, How Soaps Changed the World, Big Brother's Big Mouth, and The Top 100 TV Christmas Crackers. She is well known as the soap opera expert on the morning television programme GMTV and is a member of the judging panel on the annual British Soap Awards. 

She worked as a presenter/reporter on TV-am in the 1980s.

However she is probably best known for appearing on ITV1's reality TV show, Celebrity Fit Club in which she lost a total of 2 stone, 7 pounds. She was voted by the panel of judges including the politician Ann Widdecombe, and the tough marine trainer Harvey Walden as the most outstanding contestant on the show, due to her commitment and constant weight loss each week. Since Celebrity Fit Club, she has qualified as an aerobics teacher and motivational fitness coach, as well as run several marathons and charity races.

Her other work credits include magazine and newspaper columns. In recent years she has written for the magazines TV Times, Soaplife and Woman's Own, and also The Sun, The Mirror, Teletext and various websites. She broadcasts on numerous radio stations, including BFBS, BBC Radio Five Live, Radio 2, The Asian Network and many regional stations.

She is married and has five rescue cats.

References

External links
Tina Baker YouTube video
Tina Baker Tina's Fitness Website
Tina Baker at gm.tv

GMTV presenters and reporters
1958 births
English television critics
Living people
People from Coalville